Nispa is a monotypic genus of Asian dwarf spiders containing the single species, Nispa barbatus. It was first described by K. Y. Eskov in 1993, and has only been found in Japan and Russia.

See also
 List of Linyphiidae species (I–P)

References

Linyphiidae
Monotypic Araneomorphae genera
Spiders of Asia
Spiders of Russia